Now Deh is a village in Kalej Rural District, in the Central District of Nowshahr County, Mazandaran Province, Iran. At the 2006 census, its population was 268, in 66 families.

References 

Populated places in Nowshahr County